The Stationary wavelet transform (SWT) is a wavelet transform algorithm designed to overcome the lack of translation-invariance of the discrete wavelet transform (DWT). The SWT is an inherently redundant scheme as the output of each level of SWT contains the same number of samples as the input – so for a decomposition of N levels there is a redundancy of N in the wavelet coefficients. This algorithm is more famously known as "algorithme à trous" in French (word trous means holes in English) which refers to inserting zeros in the filters. It was introduced by Holschneider et al.

Implementation
The following block diagram depicts the digital implementation of SWT.

 
In the above diagram, filters in each level are up-sampled versions of the previous (see figure below).

KIT

Applications
A few applications of SWT are specified below.

 Signal denoising
 Pattern recognition
 Brain image classification 
 Pathological brain detection

Synonyms
 Redundant wavelet transform
 Algorithme à trous
 Quasi-continuous wavelet transform
 Translation invariant wavelet transform
 Shift invariant wavelet transform
 Cycle spinning
 Maximal overlap wavelet transform (MODWT)
 Undecimated wavelet transform (UWT)

See also
 wavelet transform
 wavelet entropy
 wavelet packet decomposition

References

Wavelets